Macroglossum albolineata is a moth of the family Sphingidae. It was described by Benjamin Preston Clark in 1935 and is known from Papua New Guinea.

References

Macroglossum
Moths described in 1935